The 2012 Eurocup Clio season was the second season of the Renault–supported touring car category, a one-make racing series that is part of the World Series by Renault, the series uses Renault Clio RS 197's.

The title was clinched by Rangoni Motorsport driver Oscar Nogués, who won three races. Marc Guillot and Mike Verschuur completed top-three in the standings, with two and one win respectively.

Race calendar and results

References

External links
Website

Eurocup Clio
Eurocup Clio season
Eurocup Clio